The Hinteres Sonnwendjoch in the Austrian state of Tyrol is a mountain, and the highest peak of the  Mangfall range, a subdivision of the  Bavarian Prealps. Because the Brandenberg Alps to the south are lower, its summit offers outstanding views of the Central Alps despite its low elevation. The Hinterer Sonnwendjoch drops away steeply to the north into the Grund. The summit is made of main dolomite and, on the south side, of plattenkalk.

A long, but easy mountain hike from Valepp (890 m) in Bavaria leads up to the Bärenbadalm (1,590 m) and on to the summit. Considerably shorter, but also easy is the climb from Ackernalm (1,383 m) south of the massif, which is easily reached on the toll road from Bayrischzell or Kufstein.

Summit panorama

References

External links 

One-thousanders of Austria
Mountains of the Alps
Mountains of Tyrol (state)
Bavarian Prealps